New York's 28th State Senate district is one of 63 districts in the New York State Senate. It has been represented by Democrat Liz Krueger since 2002.

Geography
District 28 is primarily based in the Upper East Side of Manhattan, but also includes smaller parts of Gramercy, Murray Hill, and Midtown. At only 3 square miles, it is the smallest State Senate district in New York.

The district is located entirely New York's 12th congressional district, and overlaps with the 66th, 68th, 73rd, 74th, 75th, and 76th districts of the New York State Assembly.

Recent election results

2020

2018

2016

2014

2012

Federal results in District 28

References

28